Camilla Madsen (born 24 October 1993) is a Danish handball player who currently plays for SV Union Halle-Neustadt.

Honors
Youth Olympic Games:
Winner: 2010

European Women's U-19 Handball Championship:
Winner: 2011

References

External links
 DHDb - Camilla Madsen 
 Handball - Camilla Madsen 

1993 births
Living people
Danish female handball players
Handball players at the 2010 Summer Youth Olympics
Youth Olympic gold medalists for Denmark